The 1964 Northern Illinois State Huskies football team represented Northern Illinois University as a member of the Interstate Intercollegiate Athletic Conference (IIAC) during the 1964 NCAA College Division football season. Led by ninth-year head coach Howard Fletcher, the Huskies compiled an overall record of 7–2 with a mark of 3–1 in conference play, sharing the IIAC with Western Illinois. The team played home games at the 5,500-seat Glidden Field, located on the east end of campus, in DeKalb, Illinois.

Schedule

References

Northern Illinois
Northern Illinois Huskies football seasons
Interstate Intercollegiate Athletic Conference football champion seasons
Northern Illinois Huskies football